Robert Ord may refer to:
 Robert Ord (1700–1778), British lawyer and politician
 Robert L. Ord (born 1968), American businessman
 Robert L. Ord III (born 1940), U.S. Army lieutenant general